Aznab-e Khaleseh (also known as Shekarlū Khāleşeh) is a village in Chahardangeh Rural District, Hurand District, Ahar County, East Azerbaijan Province, Iran. At the 2006 census, its population was 178, in 35 families.

References 

Populated places in Ahar County